The 1994 Nebraska United States Senate election was held November 8, 1994 to select the U.S. Senator from the state of Nebraska. Democratic U.S. Senator Bob Kerrey won re-election.

Candidates

Democratic 
 Bob Kerrey, incumbent U.S. Senator

Republican 
 Jan Stoney - former President of Northwestern Bell and American Cancer Society of Nebraska Chair

Results

See also 
 1994 United States Senate elections

References 

Nebraska
1994
1994 Nebraska elections